Clara d'Anduza was a trobairitz from the first third of the 13th century, probably born to the ruling family of Anduze. Her only surviving work is a canso beginning En greu esmay et en greu pessamen. She was mentioned in a long razo to a canso of Uc de Saint Circ and was probably the addressee of a salut of Azalais d'Altier. She was probably acquainted with Pons de Capduelh.

Sources

Bruckner, Matilda Tomaryn; Shepard, Laurie; and White, Sarah. Songs of the Women Troubadours. New York: Garland Publishing, 1995. .

Trobairitz
Medieval women poets
13th-century French troubadours
French women poets
13th-century French women writers